The 2013–14 División de Honor B, the XVI edition, began on October 12, 2013 with the first matchday of regular season and finished on May 25, 2014 with the Promotion playoffs final. For 2013–14 season, the championship expands to 3 groups of 8/9 teams each.

FC Barcelona achieved the promotion to División de Honor six years after by defeating Sant Cugat 40–21 in the promotion playoff Final.

Competition format
The season comprises 1st stage or regular season, 2nd stage and Final. The regular season runs through 18 matchdays. Upon completion the regular season, the two top teams of each group play the 2nd stage. 2nd stage features two groups of three teams each. Top team of each group play the Final with the winner team being promoted to División de Honor while the loser team play the promotion playoff against the team qualified 11th in División de Honor. Teams qualified in 8th & 9th in the standings play the relegation playoff to Primera Nacional.

Points during regular season are awarded as following;

Each win means 4 points to winning team.
A draw means 2 points for each team.
1 bonus point for a team that achieves 4 tries in a match.
A defeat by 7 or less points means 1 bonus point for defeated team.

Teams

Group North
Teams from northern section of Spain

Group East
Teams from eastern section of Spain

Group South
Teams from southern section of Spain

Standings

Regular season

Group North

Source: Federación Española de Rugby

Group East

Source: Federación Española de Rugby

Group South

Source: Federación Española de Rugby

2nd phase

Group 1

Source: Scoresway

Group 2

Source: Scoresway

Final

Sant Cugat play the relegation/promotion playoff against Blusens Universidade Vigo.

See also
2013–14 División de Honor de Rugby

References

External links
Federación Española de Rugby

2013–14
B